Alexander was a merchant vessel launched at Bombay in 1803. She was shipwrecked in 1815 while on passage from Bombay to London two miles (3 km) from the Isle of Portland on the Dorset coast in the English Channel. Only five of the ship's 140 (or 150) crew and passengers survived the disaster.

Career notes
Alexander was one of the transport vessels supporting the British Invasion of Java (1811)

Loss
The wreck occurred on 27 March 1815, when Alexander entered the Channel after a lengthy voyage, and was caught by a very strong gale from the South-Southwest that pushed the ship onto the beach in front of the village of Wyke, Dorset, during the night. None of the ship's officers survived the wreck, and the incident was not observed by any witnesses on the shoreline, so the circumstances of the disaster remain somewhat unclear.

Early in the morning of the 27th, the local population discovered a large quantity of wreckage scattered along the shore for several miles in both directions. Amongst this wreckage was found the bodies of 39 lascar seamen and seven of the ship's European officers and passengers, whilst five others were found alive, all lascars, although their nationalities and genders are disputed by sources.

Local people clothed and fed the survivors, and collected the bodies on the beach for burial. The lascars were buried in a mass grave in the churchyard, as their names were lost with the ship's papers, but the Europeans were identified soon afterwards and buried under a memorial erected nearby that stated:

Alexanders  captain was Lewis Auldjo, who was a son of George Auldjo of Aberdeen, and Susan Beauvais, of Jermyn Street, St James's, London. Lewis Auldjo had married Elizabeth Cooke, the eldest daughter of Captain John Cooke of Calcutta, and it is understood from the Monumental Inscription recorded from the South Park Street Burial Ground Monument in Calcutta, that their child was also aboard on that unhappy day. In his last Will and Testament, Captain Lewis Auldjo appointed Charles Forbes, his friend, as his sole Executor.

See also
 Arniston, another East Indiaman wrecked in the same year

Citations and references
Citations

References
 
 

1803 ships
Alexander
Maritime incidents in 1815
Age of Sail merchant ships
Merchant ships of the United Kingdom